The Frei-Laubersheim fibula is a silver-gilt  bow-style fibula found in Frei-Laubersheim, Bad Kreuznach (Rhineland-Palatinate) in 1872. The grave in which it was found dates to approximately the 6th century, and was that of a presumably Frankish woman. The fibula is one of a pair, and bears a runic inscription in the Elder Futhark.

Inscription

The fibula bears a runic inscription divided into two lines, with some of the individual words separated by punctuating colons. The final characters of both lines are largely illegible due to normal wear caused by securing the now-missing pin under the catch plate. As a result, the inscription has been interpreted in various ways. The first line clearly reads:

 :  

The first word, represents a man's name found in Old High German (or ), Old English and Old Norse. Since boso also appears in compound (dithematic) names such as Bosogast and Bosochind, boso in the inscription may be a shortened form of a longer name. It could also be connected with Bosenheim (Bad Kreuznach), a small town located a few miles to the north of Frei-Laubersheim which is believed to have taken its name from the Boso clan which settled there in the middle of the 5th century. The second word, is understood as a dialectal variant of West Germanic *, the 3rd person singular past form of the verb * (to engrave, write), a term regularly appearing in runic inscriptions to describe the practice of carving or engraving runes. By the time of attestation, this * had undergone monophthongization in most West Germanic dialects: Old Saxon , Old Frisian , Old English , but Old High German . The ae in  may represent a transitional stage between the diphthong * and the long vowel which was to replace it, which may indicate a Low German origin for the inscription. The third word, is either the accusative plural or singular collective form of the word 'rune'. Thus, the first part of the inscription reads "Boso wrote (the) runes".

The second line of the inscription is more difficult to interpret. It reads:

  (or ) :  (or )

The first word, is generally interpreted as the West Germanic form of the second person singular accusative pronoun * from an earlier Common Germanic * '(to) you'. Alternative interpretations include  'then' and  'I'. The appearance of the rune ᛇ (ï) in the name is significant in that it is one of only three verified attestations of the use of the rune in the south Germanic area, the others being contained in the inscription on the Pforzen buckle and in the so-called Breza fuþark. The last word has proven to be the most difficult to interpret. It is apparently a finite verb inflected in the past third person singular, though the stem remains entirely uncertain, as does the subject of the verb. Suggestions include  or  'greeted',  'gave', and  'spoke'. Accordingly, the second line of the inscription has been variously interpreted as reading "Daþina greeted you", "(He) greeted you, Daþïna", "I, Daþina, spoke [the charm]", "Then Dalena spoke [the charm]", or "To you, Dalena, (he) gave [presents]".

Heraldry

The Frei-Laubersheim fibula appears as a charge in Frei-Laubersheim's municipal coat of arms. It occupies the field in base on an escutcheon that is tierced in mantle (divided into three in a somewhat "coatlike" pattern).

See also
 Nordendorf fibulae
 Pforzen buckle

Footnotes

References

 Arntz, Helmut (1935). Handbuch der Runenkunde. Halle/Saale.
 Düwel, Klaus (2001). Runenkunde. Stuttgart, J. B. Metzler. .
 Feist, Sigmund (1919). "Runen und Zauberwesen im germanischen Altertum" in Arkiv för Nordisk Filologi, 35, pp. 243–287.
 Gering, Hugo (1896). "Neuere Schriften zur Runenkunde" in Gering, Hugo Zeitschrift für deutsche Philologie Volume 28. Halle, Verlag der Buchhandlung des Waisenhauses, pg. 240-241.
 Haubrichs, Wolfgang (1987). "Lautverschiebung in Lothringen" in Bergmann, Rolf (Hg.) Althochdeutsch, II, Wörter und Namen, Forschungsgeschichte. Heidelberg.
 Körber, Karl T. (1900). Inschriften des Mainzer Museums. Mainz: Verlag des Altertumsvereins.
 Krause, Wolfgang; Jankuhn, Herbert (1966). Die Runeninschriften im älteren Futhark. Göttingen.
 Krogmann, Willy (1978). Die Kultur der alten Germanen. Teil I. Die materiellen Voraussetzungen. Wiesbaden.
 Looijenga, Tineke (2003). Texts and Contexts of the Oldest Runic Inscriptions. Leiden: Koninklijke Brill NV. .
 Nedoma, Robert (2006). "Schrift und Sprache in den südgermanischen Runeninschriften" in: Bammesberger, Alfred Das futhark und seine einzelsprachlichen Weiterentwicklungen. Berlin: Walter de Gruyter. .
 Opitz, Stephan (1987). Südgermanische Runeninschriften im älteren Futhark aus der Merowingerzeit. Freiburg i.Br.
 Reiter, Uwe (2006). Bosenheim: Ein Ortsporträt. SWR.de. Retrieved: 16.12.2009.
 Rieger, Max (1874). "Eine neue Runeninschrift" in Höpfner, E.; Zacher, J. Zeitschrift für deutsche Philologie, Volume 5, pp. 375–381. Halle: Verlag der Buchhandlung des Waisenhauses.
 Steiner-Welz, Sonja (2005), Runenkunde: Die Welt der Germanen. Mannheim: Reinhard Welz.
 Wimmer, Ludwig Franz Adalbert (1887). Die Runenschrift. (Aus dem Dänischen übersetzt von F. Holthausen). Berlin Weidmannsche Buchhandlung.

External links
Runenprojekt Kiel

Elder Futhark inscriptions
Individual brooches
Medieval European metalwork objects